Scaptesyle monogrammaria is a moth in the subfamily Arctiinae first described by Francis Walker in 1863. It is found in Australia.

References

Lithosiini